Richard and Adam Johnson, performing as Richard & Adam, are Welsh classical singers, best known for finishing in third place on the seventh series of Britain's Got Talent. They come from Holywell in Flintshire, Wales. Their debut album The Impossible Dream topped the UK Albums Chart and spent four consecutive weeks at number one, making it the longest-running number-one album of 2013 in the UK.

Early career
After working in a sandwich shop, the brothers performed on cruise ships one of which was the P&O Cruises ship 'Azura' and also performed on Loose Women as "The Johnson Brothers".

Career

Britain's Got Talent

Richard and Adam auditioned for Britain's Got Talent in January 2013 and was aired in April 2013. They performed 'The Impossible Dream' and were put through to the next round by the judges. The duo performed on the first live show with "Somewhere" and won with the most votes cast with over 66% of the vote, putting them through to the final.

In the Britain's Got Talent final, Richard & Adam once again performed "The Impossible Dream". In the middle of their performance, one of the members of the orchestra performing behind them—later identified as violinist Natalie Holt—stood up and started throwing eggs at Simon Cowell. The producers immediately escorted her off the stage while the duo continued. They finished third with 15.4% of the vote.

The Impossible Dream, The Christmas Album and At the Movies
In June 2013, Richard & Adam were signed to Sony Music. They released their debut album, The Impossible Dream, including the single cover of the same name on 29 July 2013. The album was released by Arista Records, the duo's current label. The album debuted at number one on the UK Albums Chart on 4 August. In its second week on sale, despite competition from US duo The Civil Wars, Richard & Adam held onto the Official Albums Chart Number 1 spot for a second week. The album contains covers of songs such as "Somewhere", "Amazing Grace" and "Bring Him Home". The album stayed at number one for four consecutive weeks.

On 12 September 2013, Richard & Adam announced details of their second album, The Christmas Album, which was released on 2 December. The album put an operatic twist on Christmas songs such as "Away in a Manger", "Silent Night" and "Once in Royal David's City".

In May 2014, it was announced that Richard & Adam's third album would be called At the Movies, composed of songs from soundtracks. The album debuted at number five on the UK Albums Chart.

In 2019 they took part in Britain's Got Talent: The Champions, though were eliminated in the preliminaries.

Discography

Albums

Singles

Tours
Following The Impossible Dream retaining number one on the charts, the brothers toured the UK in 2014.

References

External links
 Official website

Living people
People from Holywell, Flintshire
Britain's Got Talent contestants
Welsh musical duos
Musical groups established in 2012
2012 establishments in Wales
Year of birth missing (living people)